Varini can refer to:
The Warini, a barbarian tribe of Late Antiquity
 Variņi parish, a parish in Latvia
 Felice Varini, Swiss artist